Dallas College Mountain View Campus (often stylized as Mountain View or MVC) is a public community college in Dallas, Texas.  It is part of Dallas College. The campus opened its doors in 1970 and features an enrollment of about 11,500 credit students and another 9,000 continuing education students. It also offers more than 35 degree and certificate programs.

Trini Garza Early College High School, an early college senior high school of the Dallas Independent School District, is on the college property.

References

External links
 Official website

Educational institutions established in 1970
Universities and colleges accredited by the Southern Association of Colleges and Schools
Dallas College
NJCAA athletics
Two-year colleges in Texas